Heinz-Jörg Eckhold (25 September 1941 – 17 October 2022) was a German politician.

A member of the Christian Democratic Union, he served in the Landtag of North Rhine-Westphalia from 1995 to 2005.

Eckhold died on 17 October 2022, at the age of 81.

References

1941 births
2022 deaths
Christian Democratic Union of Germany politicians
Members of the Landtag of North Rhine-Westphalia
Recipients of the Cross of the Order of Merit of the Federal Republic of Germany
People from Oberhausen